Nenapina Doni (Kannada: ನೆನಪಿನ ದೋಣಿ) is a 1986 Indian Kannada film,  directed by  T. S. Nagabharana and produced by V. Verghese. The film stars Anant Nag, Girish Karnad, Geetha and Roopadevi in the lead roles. The film has musical score by Vijaya Bhaskar.

Cast

Anant Nag
Girish Karnad
Geetha
Roopadevi
Lokanath
C. R. Simha
B. Jayashree
Mahima
Venkatesh
Sriranga
K. V. Manjaiah
Anantha Harasur
Master Amith
Kavitha Bopaiah
Veda
Swarnamma
Rashmi
Swapna
Srinath

References

External links
 
 

1986 films
1980s Kannada-language films
Films directed by T. S. Nagabharana